Dmitry Matveyev (born May 2, 1944) is a Soviet sprint canoeist who competed in the late 1960s. He won a gold medal in the K-1 4 x 500 m event at the 1966 ICF Canoe Sprint World Championships in East Berlin.

Matveyev also competed at the 1968 Summer Olympics in Mexico City in the K-4 1000 m event, but was eliminated in the semifinals.

References

1944 births
Canoeists at the 1968 Summer Olympics
Living people
Olympic canoeists of the Soviet Union
Soviet male canoeists
Russian male canoeists
ICF Canoe Sprint World Championships medalists in kayak